The Two Brothers Roundhouse, formerly the Walter Payton Roundhouse, America's Historical Roundhouse, and Chicago, Burlington, & Quincy Roundhouse and Locomotive Shop is a historic building converted to a restaurant in Aurora, Illinois. It was originally constructed in 1856 as a roundhouse for the Chicago & Aurora Railroad (later Chicago, Burlington & Quincy Railroad) and served in this capacity until 1974. It was abandoned until 1995, when a group of investors led by Walter Payton purchased it and converted the building to an entertainment complex. Its most recent tenant is Two Brothers Brewing. The building is the oldest limestone roundhouse in the United States and is listed on the National Register of Historic Places.

History
The roundhouse was constructed in 1856 to serve Aurora on the Chicago & Aurora Railroad (C&A). The C&A built its own maintenance shops to facilitate further expansion of the rail system westward. The shops were also capable of producing new equipment for the rolling stock. The roundhouse was designed by Levi Hull Waterhouse, who designed several important structures in the Aurora vicinity. The walls of the structure were constructed with locally quarried limestone from Batavia, Illinois. There were originally twenty-two stalls in the roundhouse, with an additional eight added three years after completion. Ten stalls were added at an unknown later date. A small shop was also present in the roundhouse which catered to locomotive engines.

The C&A merged with the Chicago, Burlington & Quincy Railroad in 1868, which became the most trafficked railroad in Illinois by 1870. In the 1930s, the focus of the complex shifted to the new Zephyr line of diesel engines. It also constructed many passenger cars, including Pullman cars and the very first dome car. As the automobile increased in usage in the mid-20th century, rail traffic declined. The roundhouse and shops closed in 1974; most of the other shops in the district were demolished soon after.

The structure was abandoned for twenty-one years. It was added to the National Register of Historic Places on February 16, 1978. In May 1988, the American Society of Mechanical Engineers recognized the roundhouse as a landmark in mechanical engineering for its "innovative railroad yard machine shop." In 1995, the Aurora City Council voted to allow an investment group led by former Chicago Bears running back Walter Payton to purchase the building. The building re-opened in 1996 and hosted a brewpub, restaurant, museum, and open-air pavilion. Among the artifacts in the museum is Payton's championship ring from Super Bowl XX. The complex received a National Preservation Award on October 22, 1999, only days before Payton's death.

On May 2, 2011 Two Brothers Brewing Company announced via Facebook and Twitter that they had acquired America's Historical Roundhouse in Aurora Illinois. They opened a restaurant on June 18, 2011, featuring ten of their locally available beers on tap plus an additional two that are exclusive to the establishment.

Architecture
The roundhouse is actually a tetracontagon (40 sides). A steel truss structure supports wood-sheathed steel rafters, covered on the exterior by tar paper.

References

External links

ASME Landmark

Two Brothers Restaurant review by TripAdvisor

Buildings and structures in Aurora, Illinois
Industrial buildings and structures on the National Register of Historic Places in Illinois
Historic American Engineering Record in Illinois
Historic Mechanical Engineering Landmarks
National Register of Historic Places in Kane County, Illinois
Railroad roundhouses in Illinois
Transport infrastructure completed in 1856
Tourist attractions in Aurora, Illinois
Railway roundhouses on the National Register of Historic Places
Railway buildings and structures on the National Register of Historic Places in Illinois
Transportation buildings and structures in Kane County, Illinois
1856 establishments in Illinois